A by-election was held for the New South Wales Legislative Assembly electorate of Upper Hunter on 7 June 1875 caused by the death of Francis White.

Dates

Results

Francis White died. The by-election was overturned by the Election and Qualifications Committee because two polls were taken at Belltrees.

See also
Electoral results for the district of Upper Hunter
List of New South Wales state by-elections

References

1875 elections in Australia
New South Wales state by-elections
1870s in New South Wales